Nencini is an Italian surname. Notable people with the surname include:
Andrea Nencini (born 1948), Italian volleyball player
Gastone Nencini (1930–1980), Italian cyclist
Lorenzo Nencini (1806–1854), Italian sculptor
Riccardo Nencini (born 1959), Italian politician

Italian-language surnames